The 1931 Auburn Tigers football team represented Auburn University in the 1931 Southern Conference football season.  Led by second-year head coach Chet A. Wynne, the team went 5–3–1, which was the team's first winning season since 1925.

1931 was the first and only time Auburn has played the University of Wisconsin during the regular season, though they have since played twice in bowl games.

Schedule

References

Auburn
Auburn Tigers football seasons
Auburn Tigers football